Caulolatilus hubbsi, the Hubbs's tilefish, is a species of marine ray-finned fish, a tilefish belonging to the family Malacanthidae. It occurs in the eastern Pacific Ocean. Its specific name honours the American ichthyologist Carl Leavitt Hubbs (1894-1979). Studies have shown that this taxon is not readily distinguishable from Caulolatilus princeps and should be treated as a junior synonym of C. princeps.

References

hubbsi
Fish described in 1978